Thomas B. Hensley (July 30, 1932 – October 30, 1994) was an American football official in the National Football League (NFL) from 1967 to 1987. During his time in the NFL, he was selected as the umpire for Super Bowl XIX in 1985. He wore uniform number 19 during his NFL career, which was later worn by Scott Green, and is currently worn by Clay Martin.

He attended Central High School in Knoxville, Tennessee where he was inducted into the Wall of Fame in November 2009. He played football at the University of Tennessee for the years. His teammates at UT included Doug Atkins and Johnny Majors.

Mr. Hensley was a lineman at Central High School, where he graduated in 1950. After graduation, he went to Virginia Tech on a football scholarship but returned to Knoxville to play tackle on the University of Tennessee football teams in 1952 and 1953. A Knoxville News Sentinel “Sports Brief” prior to his junior year said, “Tommy Hensley, age 20, 6 foot 190 pound junior (actually 6-2 and 220 pounds), from Knoxville lettered last year as a defensive tackle. His performances on
offense during the spring increased his potential value to the team. (He) has good speed and is a conscientious worker ranked with the top tackle on the squad.” He graduated with a degree in marketing. Although he owned and operated a service station in Fountain City for 15 years and was a national-accounts director for a trucking firm for five, he was known for his association with football.

Mr. Hensley officiated high school football 15 years and Southeastern Conference football for five. His first game as an NFL official was as a linesman at New Orleans in 1967. His final 20 years of NFL officiating was as an umpire, including the 1985 Super Bowl at Stanford Stadium. Hensley was the linesman, and later umpire, on the crew of referee Bernie Ulman from 1967-74.

He was recognized for his officiating by the East Tennessee Chapter of the National Football Foundation and Hall of Fame by being presented the organization's Amateur Award. He was also inducted into the Knoxville Sports Hall of Fame.

Sometimes his large, muscular frame was a positive force in his officiating. Once he backed down a huge lineman who was upset at another official. In a game against Pittsburgh, he was bowled over from behind by a Steeler defender. He dusted himself off and continued to officiate. In his rookie year a fan rushed onto the field to "hit" the official. As he approached, Tom hit him with a right cross and the fan was carried off the field. Tom was forever named "one punch Hensley" after that event, staged in front of Washington Redskins coach, Otto Graham.

See also
1984 NFL season
NFL playoffs, 1984-85

References
Knoxville News Sentinel - Knoxville, Tennessee Published October 31, 1994, Section: Obituaries; Page C7
Halls Shopper Newspaper - Knoxville, Tennessee Published October 19, 2009, Section: A7 http://www.shoppernewsnow.com/news/101909HallsA.pdf

External links

1932 births
1994 deaths
College football officials
National Football League officials
Tennessee Volunteers football players
Virginia Tech Hokies football players